Don Alwin Rajapaksa (5 November 1905 – 7 November 1967) was a Sri Lankan politician and Member of Parliament who represented the Beliatta electorate in Hambantota district from 1947 to 1965. A founding member of Sri Lanka Freedom Party and Cabinet Minister of Agriculture and Land in Wijeyananda Dahanayake's government, he was the father of two Sri Lankan Presidents; Mahinda Rajapaksa and Gotabhaya Rajapaksa.

Personal life
Rajapaksa was born on 5 November 1905 in a hamlet called Medamulana and had his early education at Mandaduva School in Weerakatiya. His father Don David Rajapaksa, who held the post of Vidane Arachchi in Ihala Valikada Korale, sent him for secondary education to Richmond College, Galle. Having completed his education, he helped his father managing the family estate, which consisted of paddy fields and coconut plantations. He captained the Richmond College cricket team for three years.

He was married to Dandina Samarasinghe Dissanayake Palatuwe Hamine. The couple had nine children: Chamal, Jayanthi, Mahinda, Chandra, Basil, Gotabhaya, Dudley, Preethi and Gandani.

At the defeat in the 1965 general elections, Rajapaksa not only lost his political power but was also devoid of material wealth. During this period all his children, Chamal, Mahinda, Basil, Gothabhaya and Chandra were studying in Colombo and he found it difficult to meet their expenses. He sold his vehicle, leased his coconut lands and went through enormous hardships to sustain the family. When he fell seriously ill in November 1967, there was no vehicle nearby to take him to hospital. When transport was arranged belatedly his heart condition had worsened. After admission to hospital, he died 7 November 1967.

Political career
He also helped his elder brother Don Mathew, who was the State Councillor for Hambantota in attending to affairs of the electorate, gaining experience in politics. D. M. received 17,046 votes in the 1936 State Council election in Hambantota. On his brother's death, Rajapakse was nevertheless reluctant to contest the Hambantota seat at the by-election of 1945. Nevertheless, the politically influential people in the area insisted that he should contest the by-election and were finally successful in dragging him into active politics. He won the seat at the by-election and was included in the Committee on Agriculture and Land in the State Council. This gave him a good opportunity to tackle the problem of landlessness of the peasantry of Giruvapattuva. Rajapaksa adopted a 99-year lease scheme to transfer crown land to landless peasants in  plots. These measures in fact gave a boost to the paddy and coconut cultivations in Giruva Pattuva.

When the first parliamentary general elections were held in 1947 under the new constitution, the former Hambantota electorate was divided into two, namely, Beliatta and Tissamaharama electorate. Most of Western Giruva Pattuva was included in the Beliatta electorate. Rajapaksa contested in Beliatta on the United National Party, obtained 14,007 votes with a majority of 8,022 and won the seat.  

When S. W. R. D. Bandaranaike, disgruntled over the policies of the United National Party, left the party to form the Sri Lanka Freedom Party in 1951, Several parliamentarians, including Rajapaksa, Herbert Sri Nissanka and D. S. Goonesekera, followed S.W.R.D. Bandaranaike when he crossed the floor of the house to the opposition benches on 12 July 1951. The Rajapaksas supported Bandaranaike at the general elections of 1952, winning the Beliatta electorate for the SLFP where he defeated his opponent by a majority of 17,382 votes. Later on, in the historic general elections of 1956, Rajapaksa won the seat from Sri Lanka Freedom Party with 26,215 votes, which was 15,335 votes more than the opposition. Then he was elected member of parliament for Beliatta and appointed as Parliamentary Secretary to the Minister of Lands and Land Development. 

Rajapakse gave his full support to make the Paddy Act a success along with Philip Gunawardena, who was the Minister of Agriculture and Food. On 19 February 1961, he wrote a valuable article in the Silumina newspaper entitled "Katata Rahata Kurakkan" about the symbolism of Rajapaksa's and about the species in Kurakkan and the associated folk poems. In 1959 he was appointed as Cabinet Minister of Agriculture and Lands by Prime Minister Wijeyananda Dahanayake. 

Rajapaksa's ups and downs in the political arena are follow those of the Sri Lanka Freedom Party at the time. At the general election of 1960 he lost his seat. But when the UNP government was dissolved and the parliamentary elections were held for the second time in July of the same year, Rajapaksa regained his seat at Beliatta with 15,121 votes out of 35,992 and was backbencher of the government led by Sirimavo Bandaranaike. He was appointed Deputy Chairman of Committees in Parliament and subsequently Deputy Speaker. He lost his seat in the general election of 1965 to his rival, D. P. Atapattu.

Family

Don David Rajapaksa Vidanarachchi

He held the colonial post of Vidane Arachchi in Ihala Valikada Korale, Giruvapattuva in the Hambantota District.

Don Mathew Rajapaksa (1897-1945)

State councillor for Hambantota District

Don Alwin Rajapaksa (1905-1967)

He was one of the founder members of the Sri Lanka Freedom Party and was also a Deputy Speaker of Parliament and Cabinet Minister.

Family Tree

1. Don David Rajapaksa Vidanarachchi (feudal post) + Dona Gimara Weerakoon Ratnayake
1.1. Don Mathew Rajapaksa (State Councillor)
1.1.1. Lakshman Rajapaksa (Member of Parliament)
1.1.2. George Rajapaksa (Member of Parliament, Cabinet Minister of Fisheries)
1.1.2.1. Nirupama Rajapaksa (currently Deputy Minister and Member of Parliament)

1.2.  Don Alwin Rajapaksa (1905-1967) (Member of Parliament, Deputy Minister, Deputy Speaker of Parliament, Cabinet Minister) + Dandina Samarasinghe Dissanayake

1.2.1. Jayanthi Rajapaksa (1940-) (children: Himal Laleendra Hettiarachchi, Rangani Hettiarachhi)

1.2.2. Chamal Rajapaksa (1942-) (Member of Parliament, Cabinet Deputy Minister and Full Minister, former Speaker)(Children: Shashindra Rajapaksa, Shameendra Rajapaksa)
                                                
1.2.3. Mahinda Rajapaksa (1945-) (Member of Parliament, Cabinet Minister, Leader of Opposition, Prime Minister, former President of Sri Lanka)(children: Namal Rajapaksa, Yoshitha Rajapaksa, Rohitha Rajapaksa)

1.2.4. Chandra Rajapaksa (1947-2018) (children: Chaminda Rajapaksa)

1.2.5. Gotabhaya Rajapaksa (1949-) (President of Sri Lanka - 7th Executive President and former Permanent Secretary to the Ministry of Defence, Public Security, Law and Order)(children: Manoj Rajapaksa)

1.2.6. Basil Rajapaksa (1951-) (former Cabinet Minister and Member of Parliament)(Children: Thejani Rajapaksa, Bimalka Rajapaksa, Ashantha Rajapaksa)

1.2.7. Dudley Rajapaksa (1957-) (children: Mihiri Rajapaksa)

1.2.8. Preethi Rajapaksa (1959-) (children: Malaka Chandradasa, Madhawa Chandradasa, Madini Chandradasa, Malika Chandradasa)

1.2.9. Gandani Rajapaksa (1962-) (children: Eshana Ranawaka, Nipuna Ranawaka, Randula Ranawaka)

See also
List of political families in Sri Lanka

References

External links
The Rajapaksa Ancestry
D.A. Rajapaksa Has Gifted Four Worthy Sons to Save the Nation
   D. A. Rajapaksa who felt the heartbeat of the  People
  Life and times of D. A. Rajapaksa the reluctant politician
  A tribute to D. A. Rajapaksa
  The modest and Affable Leader of the people of the South
  D. A. Rajapaksa and Mahinda Chintana
 GENTLEMAN politician from Ruhuna – From a LSSP perspective

News Media (Sinhala)
  Amara Samara in Sinhala

1905 births
1967 deaths
D.A.
Sri Lankan Buddhists
Alumni of Richmond College, Galle
Sinhalese politicians
Members of the 2nd State Council of Ceylon
Members of the 1st Parliament of Ceylon
Members of the 2nd Parliament of Ceylon
Members of the 3rd Parliament of Ceylon
Members of the 5th Parliament of Ceylon
Government ministers of Sri Lanka
Deputy speakers and chairmen of committees of the Parliament of Sri Lanka
Parliamentary secretaries of Ceylon
Deputy chairmen of committees of the Parliament of Sri Lanka